Wadi Mathendous is a prehistoric archaeological site in the Mesak Settafet escarpment, located in the southwestern Fezzan region in Libya. It contains many petroglyphs of figures and objects, as well as other rock art. The chiseled animals include elephants, giraffes, aurochs, wildcats, and crocodiles. These rock engravings and cave paintings have been dated to the Neolithic period, around 8,000 years ago.

On postage stamps
The General Posts and Telecommunications Company of the Libyan government at the time, dedicated an issue of postage stamps to the rock engravings of Wadi Mathendous. The issue is made of five stamps and was released in 1978, January 1st (ref. Scott catalogue n.711-715 - Michel catalogue n.624-628).

See also

Saharan rock art

References

Saharan rock art
Archaeological sites in Libya
Fezzan